Events in the year 1991 in Namibia.

Incumbents 

 President: Sam Nujoma
 Prime Minister: Hage Geingob
 Chief Justice of Namibia: Hans Joachim Berker

Events 

 29 April – 3 May – A UNESCO seminar was held in Windhoek, where the Windhoek Declaration for the Development of a Free, Independent and Pluralistic Press was made.
 The Namibia Press Association was renamed to the Namibia Press Agency.

Deaths

References 

 
1990s in Namibia
Years of the 20th century in Namibia
Namibia
Namibia